Eynel Domingos Lima Soares (born 25 October 1998) is a Cape Verdean footballer who plays for AS Trenčín as a forward.

Club career

Braga
On 12 August 2018, Soares made his professional debut with Braga B in a 2018–19 LigaPro match against Paços Ferreira.

References

External links

2000 births
Living people
Cape Verdean footballers
Association football forwards
S.C. Braga B players
AS Trenčín players
Liga Portugal 2 players
Slovak Super Liga players
Expatriate footballers in Portugal
Cape Verdean expatriate sportspeople in Portugal
Expatriate footballers in Slovakia
Cape Verdean expatriate sportspeople in Slovakia